Playa Blanca Marine Wetland (Blanca Beach Marine Wetland), is a protected area in Costa Rica, managed under the Central Pacific Conservation Area, it was created in 1994 by decree 23127-MIRENEM.

References 

Nature reserves in Costa Rica
Protected areas established in 1994